Aliwal North (officially Maletswai) is a town in central South Africa on the banks of the Orange River, Eastern Cape Province. It is a medium-sized commercial centre in the northernmost part of the Eastern Cape.

History

Sir Harry Smith, then Governor of the Cape Colony, formally founded the small town of Aliwal North in the Cape Province of South Africa in 1850. He named the town "Aliwal North" in memory of his victory over the Sikhs at the Battle of Aliwal during the First Sikh War in India in 1846. The town was laid out in 1849 on ground acquired by the government. This was auctioned and 38 lots were sold for £972.

The park in the centre of Aliwal North, the Juana Square Gardens was named after Smith's wife Juana Maria de Los Dolores de Leon. One of the first white settlers in the area, Pieter Jacobus de Wet built a house at the nearby Buffelsvlei around 1828. Municipal status was attained in 1882.

The railway line from Molteno reached Aliwal North on 2 September 1885.

On 8th January 1901, following the evacuation of Smithfield during the Second Boer War, Major Kendal Pretyman Apthorp established the Aliwal North concentration camp, which at its height housed approximately 2,000 Boer refugees. The camp was closed by November 1902 after the inmates had been repatriated to their homes.

Education

Aliwal North has 10 Primary Schools and 5 High Schools and a higher education and training (tertiary school), Ikhala TVET College.

Primary Schools are:
Alheit van der Merwe Primary School
Holy Cross Primary
Flamingo Primary School
Laerskool Aliwal-Noord
Maletswai Primary School
Nchafatso Primary School
Nkosi sikelela' Private Primary School
Pelomosa Primary School
Vulamazibuko Primary School
Vumile Primary School

High Schools:
Malcomess Senior Secondary School
Hoërskool Aliwal-Noord
Bishop Demont High School
Egqili Senior Secondary School
Faith high School

Geography 
The settlement of the area and its development into a town probably is connected to the presence of good water, thermal springs and a good fording place ('drift') across the Orange River, just below its confluence with the Kraai River. The Frere Bridge was opened in 1880 and later replaced with the General Hertzog Bridge, leading to Bloemfontein, 206 km to the north. To the south-west of the town, the Kramberg raises to 2000 m above sea level.

Layout 
The central business district is surrounded by the following suburbs:  Dukathole, Hilton, Joe Gqabi, the Springs (where the well-known Aliwal Spa is situated) and Arborsig. Many residents and staff of the Goedemoed Correctional Services facility (situated on the Free State side of the Orange River) use the town's many businesses, hospital, churches and schools.

The town is connected to neighbouring towns via a good roads system, and serve as a thoroughfare for tourists en route to resorts in the Eastern Cape Drakensberg. Unfortunately, the railway station had to close, due to lack of rail usage. The town also has a good airfield with three grass runways, safe for use during daylight.

Notable people
Joe Gqabi (1921-1981), African National Congress activist
Thamsanqa Kambule, South African Mathematician and Educator
Bongani Ndulula, South African footballer
François Steyn, Springbok Rugby player
Wandisile Letlabika, South African footballer

Tourism
The principal attractions of Aliwal North are two hot mineral springs, both of which have extremely high concentrations of minerals and gases.

The thermal springs resort, named Aliwal Spa, is located within the municipal area. During 2010–2014 the resort underwent re-construction by Maletswai Local Municipality's contractors, and opened again for public use in 2015.

Climate
Köppen climate classification: subtropical highland climate (Cwb).

References

External links 

Second Boer War concentration camps
Populated places in the Walter Sisulu Local Municipality
Hot springs of South Africa